A laundry symbol, also called a care symbol, is a pictogram indicating the manufacturer's suggestions as to methods of washing, drying, dry-cleaning and ironing clothing. Such symbols are written on labels, known as care labels or care tags, attached to clothing to indicate how a particular item should best be cleaned. While there are internationally recognized standards for the care labels and pictograms, their exact use and form differ by region. In some standards, pictograms coexist with or are complemented by written instructions.

Standards 
GINETEX, the France-based European association for textile care labelling, was formed in 1963 in part to define international standards for the care and labelling of textiles. By the early 1970s, GINETEX was working with ISO to develop international standards for textile labelling, eventually leading to the ISO 3758 standard, Textiles – Care labelling code using symbols. ISO 3758 was supplemented in 1993, revised in 2005 and again in 2012 with reviews of the standard held on a five-year cycle.

In North America, the Standards Council of Canada in 1987 adopted CAN/CGSB-86.1-M87, a colour-based textile care labelling system where green indicated "go ahead", yellow "be careful", and red "stop". In 2003, this system was withdrawn in favor of a pictogram-based system harmonized with North American and international standards. In 1996, ASTM International published a system of pictorial care instructions as D5489 Standard Guide for Care Symbols for Care Instructions on Textile Products with revisions in 1998, 2001, 2007, 2014, and 2018.

American Cleaning institute developed and published their guide to fabric care symbols.

Additional textile care labelling systems have been developed for Australia, China, and Japan. Worldwide, all of these systems tend to use similar pictograms or labelling to convey laundry care instructions. , the pictograms are not encoded in Unicode standards, because these symbols are not in public domain across various countries and are copyright.

Pictograms

General 
The care label describes the allowable treatment of the garment without damaging the textile. Whether this treatment is necessary or sufficient, is not stated. A milder than specified treatment is always acceptable. The symbols are protected and their use is required to comply with the license conditions; incorrect labelling is prohibited. A bar below each symbol calls for a gentler treatment than usual and a double bar for a very gentle treatment.

Washing 
A stylized washtub is shown, and the number in the tub means the maximum wash temperature (degrees Celsius). A bar under the tub signifies a gentler treatment in the washing machine. A double bar signifies very gentle handling. A hand in the tub signifies that only (gentle) hand washing (not above 40 °C) is allowed. A cross through washtub means that the textile may not be washed under normal household conditions. In the North American standard, dots are used to indicate the proper temperature range.

In the European standard, the level of wash agitation recommended is indicated by bars below the wash tub symbol. Absence of bar indicates a maximum agitation (cotton wash), a single bar indicates medium agitation (synthetics cycle) and a double bar indicates very minimal agitation (silk/wool cycle). The bar symbols also indicate the level of spin recommended with more bars indicating lower preferred spin speed.

Bleaching 
An empty triangle (formerly lettered Cl) allows the bleaching with chlorine or non-chlorine bleach. Two oblique lines in the triangle prohibit chlorine bleaching. A crossed triangle prohibits any bleaching.

Drying 
A circle in the square symbolizes a clothes dryer. One dot requires drying at reduced temperature and two dots for normal temperature. The crossed symbol means that the clothing does not tolerate machine drying. In the U.S. and Japan, there are other icons for natural/line drying.

Tumble drying

Natural drying

Ironing 
The iron with up to three dots allows for ironing. The number of dots are assigned temperatures: one prescribes 110 °C, two for 150 °C and three for 200 °C. An iron with a cross prohibits ironing.

Professional cleaning 

A circle identifies the possibilities of professional cleaning. A bar under the symbol means clean gently, and two bars means very gentle cleaning.

Chemical cleaning 
The letters P and F in a circle are for the different solvents used in professional dry cleaning.

Wet cleaning 
The letter W in a circle is for professional wet cleaning.

References

External links 

 GINETEX: The International Association for Textile Care Labelling-Care Symbols
 ISO 3758:2012 — Textiles — Care labelling code using symbols
 Home Laundering Consultative Council — What Symbols Mean
 The revised Canadian standard
 Swedish care symbols
 United States care symbols
 US, Japanese, and UK woven washing label symbols
 Laundry Guide to Common Care Symbols — Textile Industry Affairs
 Guide to Common Home Laundering & Drycleaning Symbols — Textile Industry Affairs

Consumer symbols
Laundry
Pictograms